Hanakia may refer to:

 Haná (Haná region, Hanakia), an ethnographic region in Moravia, Czech Republic
 Chanákia (Hanákia), a village of Alpochori community in the municipal unit of Iardanos, Elis, Greece
 Al Henakiyah (Al Hunakiyah, Al Hanakiya, Al Hanakia), a city and governorate in Al Madinah Province, Saudi Arabia
 Hanakia, a fossil genus of vesper bats.

See also 
 Hanak
 Hanák
 Hanuka 
 Hanukkah